Rebecca Sue Eisenberg is an American lawyer and professor. She is a Robert and Barbara Luciano Professor at the University of Michigan Law School.

Education
Eisenberg graduated with a Bachelor of Arts degree from Stanford University and JD from UC Berkeley School of Law where she also served as an editor of the California Law Review.

Career
Eisenberg began her law career as a clerk for Judge Robert F. Peckham at the United States District Court for the Northern District of California. Eisenberg practiced law in San Francisco, California.

In 1984, Eisenberg joined the faculty at the University of Michigan Law School, where she was subsequently named a Robert and Barbara Luciano Professor. She was one of the first female faculty in Michigan's law school, with Sallyanne Payton and Christina Whitman being hired eight years before her. In 1993, Eisenberg published a journal article titled "The Scholar as Advocate."

During the 1999–2000 academic year, Eisenberg became a visiting professor of law, science, and technology at Stanford Law School.

Awards 
 2002 Distinguished Service Award. UC Berkeley School of Law.

References

External links 
 Rebecca Eisenberg at 2004 Patent Reform Symposium

20th-century births
Living people
American legal scholars
Stanford Law School alumni
UC Berkeley School of Law alumni
Stanford Law School faculty
UC Berkeley School of Law faculty
University of Michigan Law School faculty
Year of birth missing (living people)
Place of birth missing (living people)